NASAA can mean:
 National Association for Sustainable Agriculture Australia
 National Assembly of State Arts Agencies
 National Association of State Approving Agencies
 North American Securities Administrators Association